Feryna Wazheir is a British actress.  She began her acting career in amateur theatre and made her break in the industry after she was discovered by Indian photographer Farrokh Chothia.

Feryna has been a part of Bollywood films; Ketan Mehta's Rang Rasiya with Randeep Hooda, Raj Kanwar's Sadiyaan opposite Shatrugan Sinha's son Luv Sinha and  Rekha, Rishi Kapoor and Hema Malini. Wazheir was also the brand ambassador of Kolkata jewellery brand, P.C. Chandra Jewellers, for two years. 
She also played the character of "Tasneem" in the 2016 film Airlift alongside Akshay Kumar and Nimrat Kaur. She recently acted  in a short British film titled as A Secret Heart by director Cary Sawhney. In this film, she is essaying the role of a British Jewish girl from World War 2.

Early life
Feryna was born into an Indian Muslim family in Glasgow, Scotland.

She took part in amateur theatre and voice-overs and also performed in the play The Vagina Monologues by playwright Eve Ensler. At university, Feryna studied film communication and cultural studies. During a vacation to India, Feryna was spotted by photographer Farookh Chotia who used her in shoots for Elle India, Seventeen and L'Officiel.

Feryna has since trained and worked under Satyadev Dubey and Alyque Padamsee, as well as at the Royal Academy of Dramatic Arts [RADA] in London.

Career
Feryna started her career in lead roles in music videos by A. R. Rahman and Hariharan. Soon after, in 2010, she made her Bollywood debut in Sadiyaan. The late Yash Chopra, once said that she is "beauty, innocence and vulnerability personified".

Feryna then acted in Ketan Mehta's Rang Rasiya, which won the Audience Award at London Indian Film Festival in 2011 before it was released in 2014. In the film, which is based on 19th century Indian painter, Raja Ravi Varma's life, Feryna plays a journalist and the third woman in his life. Following her festival accolade, Feryna was appointed official Brand Ambassador for the London Indian Film Festival (LIFF) 2012. She reprised her role as the face of LIFF in 2013.

In 2012, Feryna also did a short British film Khaana directed by LIFF's creative director Cary Sawhney. The film explores the boundaries between home and the outside world and Feryna plays a young orthodox Muslim woman who loves the British dish of fish and chips. The film, which has toured the festival circuit in the US, won the "Future Filmmaker Award 2012" at the Palm Springs Short Film Festival 2012 and "Best Short Film" at the New York film festival 2013.

In 2016 Feryna appeared in film Airlift as Tasneem alongside Akshay Kumar and Nimrat Kaur, set in Kuwait 1990 when Saddam Hussein invaded Kuwait. She also acted in a short British film titled as A Secret Heart by director Cary Shawney. In this film, she is seen in the role of a British Jewish girl from World War 2. The story is inspired by the British film A Matter of Life & Death, by Powell and Pressburger.

Filmography

References

External links

Living people
1986 births
Actresses from Glasgow
Scottish film actresses
Scottish stage actresses
British film actresses
British stage actresses
Scottish people of Indian descent
British actresses of Indian descent
Alumni of RADA
British Muslims
Actresses in Hindi cinema
Scottish expatriates in India
British expatriate actresses in India
European actresses in India
21st-century British actresses